Fellhanera baeomycoides is a species of lichen in the family Pilocarpaceae. Found in Brazil, it was formally described as a new species in 2017 by Marcela Eugenia da Silva Cáceres and André Aptroot. The type specimen was collected by the authors along a trail near a field station in the Adolfo Ducke Forest Reserve (Manaus); here it was found growing on the ground in an open area of an old-growth rainforest. The lichen has a granular, grayish-green thallus that lacks a cortex and a prothallus. The species epithet refers to the way the stipitate apothecia resemble those in genus Baeomyces.

References

Pilocarpaceae
Lichen species
Lichens described in 2017
Lichens of North Brazil
Taxa named by André Aptroot
Taxa named by Marcela Cáceres